Chhong Bunnath (born 28 November 1998) is a Cambodian footballer who plays for Nagaworld on loan from Visakha in the Cambodian Premier League.

Club career
Bunnath made his senior debut in Cambodia League in 2018 For Soltilo Angkor.

International career
Bunnath  made his senior debut in 2020 AFC U-23 Championship qualification against Australia national under-23 soccer team on 22 March 2019.

External links
 Chhong Bunnath at NationalFootballTeams

Living people
Cambodia international footballers
1998 births
Cambodian footballers
People from Siem Reap province
Association football central defenders
Visakha FC players
Cambodian Premier League players